Hoheria is a genus of six species of flowering plants in the family Malvaceae. All are endemic to New Zealand. The genus name is a latinization of the Māori language name, houhere.  That name, as well as lacebark and ribbonwood, are often used as common names. The name lacebark comes from the lace-like fibrous inner bark layer.

Hoheria are mostly evergreen, with Hoheria glabrata (mountain ribbonwood) a deciduous species. The flowers are attractive to butterflies. They are borne in axils on jointed peduncles and produce hard, dry seed capsules. The leaves are serrate to dentate and ovate to lanceolate in shape. Juvenile foliage may persist on young plants for several years, and may have a metallic cast.

Some species are cultivated in New Zealand and Great Britain as ornamental plants. Numerous cultivars have been developed for use in gardens, of which the hybrid 'Glory of Amlwch' has gained the Royal Horticultural Society's Award of Garden Merit.

Species
 Hoheria angustifolia Raoul – narrow-leaved lacebark or narrow-leaved houhere
 Hoheria equitum – Poor Knights houhere
 Hoheria glabrata Sprague & Summerh – mountain lacebark or mountain ribbonwood
 Hoheria lyallii Hook.f – mountain lacebark
 Hoheria populnea A.Cunn – New Zealand mallow, lacebark or houhere
 Hoheria sexstylosa Col – long-leaved lacebark or long-leaved ribbonwood

Notes

References
 Flora of New Zealand: Hoheria
 The Hoheria Page
 Royal Society of New Zealand

 
Malvaceae genera
Trees of New Zealand